Rural Metro Fire, founded in 1948, is an American private fire department that provides fire protection and emergency medical services to individual homeowners and commercial businesses in unincorporated locations throughout the United States, primarily under a subscription-based model.  Municipalities and fire districts also contract Rural Metro to provide fire protection, prevention and emergency medical services.

History

The company was founded by Lou Witzeman, a newspaper reporter, after he witnessed a house fire near his home just outside the city limits of Phoenix, Arizona in 1948. There was no fire department established for the area; so Witzeman, feeling something had to be done, purchased a fire engine and proceeded to go door to door asking residents to subscribe to the new fire service by paying an annual membership fee (in lieu of taxes). This was the origin of the Rural Fire Department, later renamed Rural Metro Fire Department.  In the 1980s, the company expanded into ambulance service. Rural Metro Fire began listing shares in 1993 on the NASDAQ exchange under the stock symbol RURL.

In 2011 Investment Fund Warburg Pincus purchased Rural Metro in a $438 million cash deal. By early 2013 Rural Metro filed for Chapter 11 restructuring  in Federal Court in Delaware after missing an interest payment on its debt. The reorganization would see bondholders infuse $135 million in new capital. Some contracts were renegotiated but no services were affected.

In 2015, Rural Metro Fire merged with American Medical Response  and senior management was released or merged into the parent corporation. In 2018, both American Medical Response and Rural Metro Fire became part of Global Medical Response.

Community fire protection services
Rural Metro Fire provides fire protection services primarily under a subscription-based model to individual homeowners and commercial property owners in unincorporated areas that do not offer municipal fire protection services in various areas of the United States. These areas are not included within municipal fire department boundaries or paid for by property taxes. It is the business model that Rural Metro Fire was founded upon. In other areas, municipalities contract with Rural Metro Fire partners to provide fire protection, prevention and emergency medical services. In the event that Rural Metro Fire Department provides services to non-subscribers either in or around the communities they serve, the property owner is billed after the incident to recoup costs associated with the emergency.

Specialty Fire Division
Rural Metro also provides fire protection, safety, and security services for airports, industrial facilities, and wildland fire prevention and protection. The division maintains membership in the following organizations: National Fire Protection Association (NFPA), International Association of Fire Chiefs (IAFC); Aircraft Rescue and Fire Fighting Working Group (ARFF WG); American Association of Airport Executives (AAAE); AAAE-Great Lakes Chapter; Louisiana Airport Managers and Associates (LAMA), and ISNetworld.

See also
Fire Department
Emergency medical services
Rescue

References

Fire departments in Arizona 
Fire departments of the United States
American companies established in 1948
1948 establishments in Arizona